The 1987 Mr. Olympia contest was an IFBB professional bodybuilding competition held on October 31, 1987, at the Scandinavium in Gothenburg, Sweden.

Results
Total prize money awarded was $120,000.

Notable events

Lee Haney won his fourth consecutive Mr. Olympia title

References

External links 
 Mr. Olympia

 1987
Mr. Olympia
Mr. Olympia
Bodybuilding competitions in Sweden
International sports competitions in Gothenburg
Mr. Olympia
Mr. Olympia, 1987